"Walking in the Park with Eloise" is an instrumental written by Jim McCartney. It was later recorded by his son Paul McCartney with his band Wings and released as a single under the name the Country Hams. The B-side, "Bridge on the River Suite", is another instrumental composition, credited to Paul and Linda McCartney.

The Dixieland jazz style of "Walking in the Park with Eloise" deviates from the pop and rock stylings of much of McCartney's recordings. The song (along with its B-side) was later included in the Archive Collection reissue of Wings' 1975 album Venus and Mars in 2014. Additionally, an orchestral version of the track, arranged by Carl Davis and performed by the Chamber Orchestra of London, was featured in the 2016 film Ethel & Ernest and included on its soundtrack. This version was also included in The 7" Singles Box in 2022.

Personnel

Paul McCartney – bass, washboard
Denny Laine – acoustic guitar
Geoff Britton – drums
Chet Atkins – electric guitar
Floyd Cramer – piano
Bobby Thompson – banjo
Denis Good – trombone
Don Sheffield – trumpet
Bill Puitt – clarinet

References

1976 songs
Song recordings produced by Paul McCartney
Paul McCartney and Wings songs
Music published by MPL Music Publishing
Paul McCartney songs